Destined for Blues is a 2005 Polish film directed by Jan Kidawa-Błoński. It tells the story of Ryszard "Rysiek" Riedel, leader of Polish blues rock band Dżem. The movie concentrates on his family relationships with both his wife Małgorzata and his father, his music career and his addiction to heroin. Destined for Blues won Polish Film Awards for Best Costume Design and Gdynia Polish Film Festival awards for Best Costume Design, Best Debut Actor (Tomasz Kot) and Audience Award.

Film was shot in Tychy, Katowice, Warszawa, Nieporęt and Świętochłowice in October 2004.

Cast 
 Tomasz Kot as Ryszard Riedel
 Jolanta Fraszyńska as Małgorzata "Gola" Riedel
 Maciej Balcar as Indianer
 Adam Baumann as Ryszard's father
 Anna Dymna as Małgorzata's mother
 Joanna Bartel as Ryszard's mother
 Przemysław Bluszcz as Leszek Martinek
 Paweł Berger as himself
 Beno Otręba as himself
 Adam Otręba as himself
 Jerzy Styczyński as himself
 Zbigniew Szczerbiński as himself
 Błażej Otreba as Drummer
 Zbigniew Zamachowski as School janitor
 Przemysław Saleta as Gruber's bodyguard

Awards 
 Polish Film Awards
 Best Costume Design – Ewa Krauze
 Gdynia Polish Film Festival
 Best Costume Design – Ewa Krauze
 Best Debut Actor – Tomasz Kot
 Audience Award – Jan Kidawa-Błoński

Nominations 
 Gdynia Polish Film Festival
 Best Actor – Tomasz Kot
 Best Actress – Jolanta Fraszyńska
 Best Supporting Actress – Anna Dymna
 Best Cinematography – Grzegorz Kuczeriszka
 Best Editing – Cezary Grzesiuk
 Best Film Score – Dżem
 Best Production Design – Joanna Białousz

Soundtrack 
Soundtrack was released 7 November 2005. It is a compilation of Dżem's songs.

 Złoty paw – 6:03 (A Golden Peacock)
 Wiem, na pewno wiem – nie, nie kocham cię (live) (I Know, I Know For Sure – I Don't Love You) – 4:58
 Czerwony jak cegła (As Red As a Brick)  – 5:19
 List do M. (Letter to M.) – 6:52
 Mała aleja róż (live) (Little Avenue of Roses) – 5:34
 Sen o Victorii (live) (A Dream about Victoria) – 2:58
 Jesiony (Ash-trees) – 6:40
 Norweska impresja bluesowa (live) (Norwegian Blues Impression) – 3:22
 Skazany na bluesa (Destined for Blues) – 5:26
 Autsajder (Outsider) – 6:38
 Whisky – 5:26
 Niewinni i ja – cz. I i II (live) (The Innocent and Me – Part I & II) – 14:17

References

External links 
 
 

2000s Polish-language films
2005 films